General Karim Agha Khan Bouzarjomehri (1886–1951) was a leading Iranian military general and supporter of Reza Pahlavi.

Buzarjomehri started military training at 13 years of age, and became Reza Shah's most trusted figures.

He was banished from Tehran along with Reza Shah during World War II, and later carried out his last mission of accompanying the dead body of Reza Shah back to Iran.

References used
The following reference was used for the above writing: 'Alí Rizā Awsatí (عليرضا اوسطى), Iran in the Past Three Centuries (Irān dar Se Qarn-e Goz̲ashteh - ايران در سه قرن گذشته), Vols. 1 and 2 (Paktāb Publishing - انتشارات پاکتاب, Tehran, Iran, 2003).  (Vol. 1),  (Vol. 2).

1886 births
Imperial Iranian Army major generals
1951 deaths
Mayors of Tehran
Commanders of Imperial Iranian Air Force